The La Habra Stakes is an American Thoroughbred horse race for three-year-old fillies run at Santa Anita Park in Arcadia, California early in the year.  A Grade III stakes race, originally at about 6.5 furlongs on the Hillside Turf Course, it's raced on the turf oval at 5.5 furlongs since 2020 and offers a purse of $100,000.

This race is named for the city of La Habra, California, some distance south of the Santa Anita Racetrack.  Once a land grant named by its owner, Rancho Cañada de La Habra, it's one of southern California's earliest settlements.

The race was not run in 2010.

Super Freaky holds the stakes record at 1:12.66.  In 2009, Pasar Silbano ran it in 1:12.67.

Past winners

 2011 – Cambina (Ire) (Garrett Gomez)
 2009 – Pasar Silbano (Ire) (Mike E. Smith)
 2008 -  Passion (Rafael Bejarano) (Ariege, winner of the Santa Anita Oaks, placed.)
 2007 – Super Freaky (Jon Court)
 2006 – Harriet Lane (Kent Desormeaux) 
 2005 – Shining Energy (René Douglas)
 2004 – Very Vegas (Mike Ruis)
 2003 – Luvah Girl (GB)
 2002 – High Society (Brice Blanc)
 2001 – Serena's Tune (first foal of Serena's Song.)
 2000 – Squall City
 1999 – Aviate
 1998 – Conectis
 1997 – Lavender
 1996 – To B Super
 1995 – Cat's Cradle
 1994 – Dezibelles Star
 1993 – 
 1992 – 
 1991 – Nice Assay (J. Paco Gonzalez)
 1983 – Little Hailey
 1977 – Reminiscing
 1976 – Dancing Femme (American Champion Older Female Horse for 1977, Cascapedia, placed.)
 1975 – NOT RUN
 1974 – June's Love
 1973 – Driftin Along

References

  Santa Anita Park Official Website

Horse races in California
Graded stakes races in the United States
Turf races in the United States